A province is a form of subnational governmental entity.

Province also may refer to any of the following subdivisions:

Jurisdictions 
 Roman province, or provincia, administrative unit in the Roman empire
 Ecclesiastical province, large jurisdiction of religious government
 Regular province, jurisdiction within a religious order or congregation
 Province (Gaelic games), a body consisting of several counties
 Prowincja, a division of the Polish-Lithuanian Commonwealth

Spatial constructs  delimited by geophysical criteria 

 Geologic province, defined region
 Physiographic province, geographic region based on geomorphology

Media 

 "Province" (song), on 2006 album Return to Cookie Mountain by group TV on the Radio 
 The Province (film), 1991 Dutch work
 The Vancouver Province (or The Province), newspaper of the western-Canada city

See also 
 Provence (disambiguation)
 Provincial (disambiguation)